Diaphania euryzonalis is a moth in the family Crambidae. It was described by George Hampson in 1912. It is found in Colombia, Ecuador, Venezuela, Peru, Bolivia, Brazil, Costa Rica and Mexico. The habitat consists of cloud forests.

The length of the forewings is 14–18 mm. There is a terminal and costal band on the forewings. Both bands have a combination of dark brown and light brown scales, with a purple gloss. The terminal band on the hindwings is brown and has less purple gloss. The translucent white area of the hindwing has a small brown dot.

References

Moths described in 1912
Diaphania